Pampas is a city in Peru.  It is the capital of the Tayacaja Province and it was established on June 21, 1825. According to the 2007 census had a population of 9,973 (11,566 in the metropolitan area). It has an approximate altitude of 3,276 metres.

Transportation
The city is connected to the nearby cities like Huancayo and Ayacucho by partially paved roads.

Education 
The city house a branch of the Universidad Nacional de Huancavelica and it is home of a local technical institute; the Instituto Tecnologico Pampas - Tayacaja.

Health 
The city has now a new hospital, the Hospital Pampas that serve the city and the towns nearby.

Images

References

External links 

Populated places in the Huancavelica Region

br:Pampas